Radio Kontakt or Kontakt Radio is a Bosnian local commercial radio station, broadcasting from Banja Luka, Bosnia and Herzegovina. This radio station broadcasts a variety of programs such as music and local news.

The owner of the radio station is the company ODGOVOR KONTAKT d.o.o. Banja Luka. Cable television channel Kontakt TV is also part of company.

The program is mainly produced in Serbian at one FM frequency (Banja Luka ) and it is available in the city of Banja Luka as well as in nearby municipalities.

Estimated number of listeners of Radio Kontakt is around 159,556.

Frequencies
 Banja Luka

See also 
 List of radio stations in Bosnia and Herzegovina
 Big Radio 3
 Radio A
 Pop FM
 Radio Kozara

References

External links 
 www.mojkontakt.com
 www.radiostanica.ba
 www.fmscan.org
 Communications Regulatory Agency of Bosnia and Herzegovina

Banja Luka
Radio stations established in 1997
Mass media in Banja Luka